Oran Franklin Frazier (November 26, 1908 – August 15, 1992) was an American Negro league second baseman in the 1930s.

A native of Montgomery, Alabama, Frazier attended Alabama State Teachers College. He played for the Montgomery Grey Sox in 1932. Frazier died in Selma, Alabama in 1992 at age 83.

References

External links
 and Seamheads

1908 births
1992 deaths
Montgomery Grey Sox players
Baseball second basemen
Baseball players from Montgomery, Alabama
20th-century African-American sportspeople